The term military medicine has a number of potential connotations. It may mean:

A medical specialty, specifically a branch of occupational medicine attending to the medical risks and needs (both preventive and interventional) of soldiers, sailors and other service members. This disparate arena has historically involved the prevention and treatment of infectious diseases (especially tropical diseases), and, in the 20th Century, the ergonomics and health effects of operating military-specific machines and equipment such as submarines, tanks, helicopters and airplanes. Undersea and aviation medicine can be understood as subspecialties of military medicine, or in any case originated as such. Few countries certify or recognize "military medicine" as a formal speciality or subspeciality in its own right.
 The planning and practice of the surgical management of mass battlefield casualties and the logistical and administrative considerations of establishing and operating combat support hospitals. This involves military medical hierarchies, especially the organization of structured medical command and administrative systems that interact with and support deployed combat units. (See Battlefield medicine.)
 The administration and practice of health care for military service members and their dependents in non-deployed (peacetime) settings. This may (as in the United States) consist of a medical system paralleling all the medical specialties and sub-specialties that exist in the civilian sector. (See also Veterans Health Administration which serves U.S. veterans.)
 Medical research and development specifically bearing upon problems of military medical interest. Historically, this encompasses all of the medical advances emerging from medical research efforts directed at addressing the problems encountered by deployed military forces (e.g., vaccines or drugs for soldiers, medical evacuation systems, drinking water chlorination, etc.) many of which ultimately prove important beyond the purely military considerations that inspired them.

Legal status
Military medical personnel engage in humanitarian work and are "protected persons" under international humanitarian law in accordance with the First and Second Geneva Conventions and their Additional Protocols, which established legally binding rules guaranteeing neutrality and protection for wounded soldiers, field or ship's medical personnel, and specific humanitarian institutions in an armed conflict. International humanitarian law makes no distinction between medical personnel who are members of the armed forces (and who hold military ranks) and those who are civilian volunteers. All medical personnel are considered non-combatants under international humanitarian law because of their humanitarian duties, and they may not be attacked and not be taken as prisoners of war; hospitals and other medical facilities and transports identified as such, whether they are military or civilian, may not be attacked either. The red cross, the red crescent and the red crystal are the protective signs recognised under international humanitarian law, and are used by military medical personnel and facilities for this purpose. Attacking military medical personnel, patients in their care, or medical facilities or transports legitimately marked as such is a war crime. Likewise, misusing these protective signs to mask military operations is the war crime of perfidy. Military medical personnel may be armed, usually with service pistols, for the purpose of self defense or the defense of patients.

Historical significance
The significance of military medicine for combat strength goes far beyond treatment of battlefield injuries; in every major war fought until the late 19th century disease claimed more soldier casualties than did enemy action. During the American Civil War (1860–65), for example, about twice as many soldiers died of disease as were killed or mortally wounded in combat. The Franco-Prussian War (1870–71) is considered to have been the first conflict in which combat injury exceeded disease, at least in the German coalition army which lost 3.47% of its average headcount to combat and only 1.82% to disease. In new world countries, such as Australia, New Zealand, the United States and Canada, military physicians and surgeons contributed significantly to the development of civilian health care.

Improvements in military medicine have increased the survival rates in successive wars, due to improvements in medical evacuation, battlefield medicine and trauma care. Similar improvements have been seen in the trauma practices during the Iraq war. Some military trauma care practices are disseminated by citizen soldiers who return to civilian practice. One such practice is where major trauma patients are transferred to an operating theater as soon as possible, to stop internal bleeding, increasing the survival rate. Within the United States, the survival rate for gunshot wounds has increased, leading to apparent declines in the gun death rate in states that have stable rates of gunshot hospitalizations.

Military medicine by country

North America

Canada
Royal Canadian Medical Service
Royal Canadian Dental Corps
Canadian Forces Health Services Group
Surgeon General (Canada)
National Defence Medical Centre

United States

Assistant Secretary of Defense for Health Affairs
Military Health System
Military Medicine, academic journal
TRICARE
United States Unified Medical Command
Uniformed Services University of the Health Sciences
Medical Education and Training Campus
Henry M. Jackson Foundation for the Advancement of Military Medicine
Defense Health Agency
National Center for Medical Intelligence
Health Professions Scholarship Program
Joint Task Force National Capital Region/Medical
Fort Belvoir Community Hospital
Association of Military Surgeons of the United States
Tactical Combat Casualty Care
Armed Forces Institute of Pathology
Armed Forces Radiobiology Research Institute
Defense Health Program Budget Activity Group
Department of Defense Medical Examination Review Board
National Museum of Health and Medicine
Medicine in the American Civil War
National Museum of Civil War Medicine

U.S. Army

Surgeon General of the U.S. Army
Army Medical Department
Battalion Aid Stations
Borden Institute
Combat Support Hospital
Fort Detrick
Fort Sam Houston
Forward Surgical Teams
United States Army Medical Corps
United States Army Nurse Corps
United States Army Veterinary Corps
Mobile Army Surgical Hospital
Portable Surgical Hospital
68W, the "combat medic"
Textbook of Military Medicine published by the U.S. Army
United States Army Medical Department Center and School
United States Army Medical Department Museum
U.S. Army Dental Command
U.S. Army Medical Command
United States Army Medical Research and Development Command
United States Army Medical Research Institute of Infectious Diseases
Walter Reed Army Medical Center
Walter Reed Army Institute of Research
U.S. Army Public Health Center
United States Army Health Services Command
Army Medical Museum and Library
Army Medical Department regimental coat of arms
Combat lifesaver course

U.S. Navy

Surgeon General of the U.S. Navy
Bureau of Medicine and Surgery
United States Navy Health Care
U.S. Navy Medical Corps
U.S. Navy Dental Corps
U.S. Navy Nurse Corps
U.S. Navy Medical Service Corps
U.S. Navy Hospital Corpsman
United States Naval Hospital (disambiguation)
Special amphibious reconnaissance corpsman
Naval Hospital Corps School
Naval Medical Center San Diego
Naval Medical Center Portsmouth
National Naval Medical Center (Walter Reed National Military Medical Center)
Naval Hospital Yokosuka Japan
Naval Health Clinic New England
Naval Health Clinic Cherry Point
Naval Medical Research Center
Naval Health Research Center
Naval Medical Forces Atlantic
Naval Medical Research Unit Dayton
Naval Submarine Medical Research Laboratory
Charleston Naval Hospital Historic District
Old Naval Observatory
Hospital ship
Sick bay
Loblolly boy
Diving medicine
United States Navy staff corps

U.S. Air Force

Surgeon General of the U.S. Air Force
U.S. Air Force Medical Service (including Dental Corps, Medical Corps, Nursing Corps, and other corps)
United States Air Force Nurse Corps
United States Air Force Pararescue
United States Air Force School of Aerospace Medicine
Museum of Aerospace Medicine
Aeromedical evacuation
Critical Care Air Transport Team
Expeditionary Medical Support System
Aviation medicine

Europe

France
French Defence Health Service
École du service de santé des armées

Belgium
Belgian Medical Component

Germany
Bundeswehr Joint Medical Service
Bundeswehr Medical Academy
Luftwaffe Institute of Aviation Medicine
Naval Medical Institute
Generaloberstabsarzt
Generalstabsarzt
Generalarzt
Oberstarzt
Oberfeldarzt
Oberstabsarzt
Stabsarzt
Oberarzt (military)
Assistenzarzt (military)

Italy 
Corpo sanitario dell'Esercito Italiano
Corpo sanitario militare marittimo
Corpo sanitario aeronautico
Servizio sanitario dell'Arma dei carabinieri

Russia

Main Military Medical Directorate
Kirov Military Medical Academy (founded in 1798)
Military academies in Russia#Kuybyshev Military Medical Academy
Military Medical Business, academic journal
Museum of Military Medicine

Serbia
Military Medical Academy

Sweden
Surgeon-General of the Swedish Armed Forces
Medical Corps of the Swedish Armed Forces
Swedish Armed Forces Centre for Defence Medicine
Surgeon-in-Chief of the Swedish Army
Surgeon-in-Chief of the Swedish Navy
Surgeon-in-Chief of the Swedish Air Force
Swedish Army Medical Corps
Swedish Naval Medical Officers' Corps
Swedish Armed Forces Diving and Naval Medicine Centre
Swedish Army Veterinary Corps

United Kingdom

Royal Navy Medical Service
Royal Naval Hospital
Queen Alexandra's Royal Naval Nursing Service
Medical Assistant (Royal Navy)
Institute of Naval Medicine
Naval surgeon
Surgeon's mate
Loblolly boy
Journal of the Royal Naval Medical Service
List of hospitals and hospital ships of the Royal Navy
Army Medical Services
Royal Army Medical Corps
Medical Support Officer
Combat Medical Technician
Royal Army Dental Corps
Royal Army Veterinary Corps
Queen Alexandra's Royal Army Nursing Corps
Territorial Force Nursing Service
Royal Army Medical College
RAF Medical Services
Princess Mary's Royal Air Force Nursing Service
RAF Centre of Aviation Medicine
RAF Institute of Aviation Medicine
Museum of Military Medicine
Surgeon-General (United Kingdom)
Defence Medical Services
Defence Medical Academy
Ministry of Defence Hospital Units
Defence CBRN Centre

Asia

India
Director General Armed Forces Medical Services (India)
Army Medical Corps (India)
Armed Forces Medical College
Command Hospital
Indian Medical Service

Israel

Logistics, Medical, and the Centers Directorate
Medical Corps (Israel)
Unit 669

Sri Lanka
Sri Lanka Army Medical Corps

Thailand
Phramongkutklao College of Medicine

Vietnam
Vietnam Military Medical University (Học Viện Quân Y) in Hanoi

Other regions

Australia

Joint Health Command (Australia)
Australian Army Medical Women's Service
Australian Army Medical Units, World War I
Australian Army Nursing Service
Royal Australian Army Medical Corps
Royal Australian Army Nursing Corps
Royal Australian Army Dental Corps
Australian Army Veterinary Corps
Australian Army Psychology Corps
Royal Australian Navy School of Underwater Medicine
RAAF Institute of Aviation Medicine
List of Australian hospital ships

South Africa
South African Medical Service
South African Military Health Service

International

International Committee of Military Medicine 
Committee of Chiefs of Military Medical Services in NATO (COMEDS)

See also

Battlefield medicine
Casualty evacuation (CASEVAC)
Combat medic
Combat stress reaction
Disaster medicine
Field hospital
Flight nurse
Flight medic
Flight surgeon
Equipment of a combat medic
History of military nutrition in the United States
List of drugs used by militaries
Medical corps
Medical evacuation (MEDEVAC)
Medical Service Corps
Medical logistics
Military ambulance
Military medical ethics
Military hospital
Military nurse
Military psychiatrist
Military psychiatry
Military psychology
Triage
Stretcher bearer

References

Further reading
 Bowlby, Sir Anthony and Colonel Cuthbert Wallace. “The Development of British Surgery at the Front.” The British Medical Journal 1 (1917): 705–721. 
 Churchill, Edward D. “Healing by First Intention and with Suppuration: Studies in the History of Wound Healing.” Journal of the History of Medicine and Allied Sciences 19 (1964): 193–214. 
 Churchill, Edward D.  “The Surgical Management of the wounded at the time of the Fall of Rome.” Annals of Surgery 120 (1944): 268–283.
 Cowdrey,  Albert E. Fighting for Life: American Military Medicine in World War II (1994), scholarly history, 400 pp
 Cowdrey,  Albert E. United States Army in the Korean War: The Medics War (1987), full-scale scholarly official history; online free
 Fauntleroy, A.M. “The Surgical Lessons of the European War.” Annals of Surgery 64 (1916): 136–150.
 Grissinger, Jay W. “The Development of Military Medicine.” Bulletin of the New York Academy of Medicine 3 (1927): 301–356. online
 Harrison, Mark. Medicine and victory: British military medicine in the Second World War (Oxford UP, 2004).
 Whayne, Col. Tom F. and Colonel Joseph H. McNinch. “Fifty Years of Medical Progress: Medicine as a Social Instrument: Military Medicine.” The New England Journal of Medicine 244 (1951): 591–601. 
 Wintermute, Bobby A. Public health and the US military: a history of the Army Medical Department, 1818-1917 (2010).

Primary sources
 Kendrick, Douglas B. Memoirs of a Twentieth-Century Army Surgeon (Sunflower University Press, 19920, U.S. Army

External links

U.S. military medicine
Military Medicine related links from USAF Air University
Association of Military Surgeons of the United States (AMSUS)
Military Medicine, the International Journal of AMSUS
Patriot Medicine, a vertical network for the military medical ecosystem
Military Medicine Through Time. Life and Death in the War Zone | NOVA | PBS
The Borden Institute Homepage
Military Medicine Documents at USU Archive
U.S. Army Preventive Medicine news archive from the 7th Infantry Division (Light) Panorama weekly newspaper 1988.
 Virtual Naval Hospital - a digital library of military medicine and humanitarian medicine
 http://www.ipernity.com/doc/57114/5652001/in/keyword/487917/self (military medical exams)

Australian military medicine
Australian Military Medicine Association

International Magazine for Military Medicine
MCIF MEDICAL CORPS INTERNATIONAL FORUM  International Magazine for Military Medicine

NATO Centre of Excellence for Military Medicine
NATO Centre of Excellence for Military Medicine

 
Military supporting service occupations